Relax Edition 2 is the seventh studio album by Trance duo Blank & Jones. It was released in 2005.

Track listing
CD1 - Sun
"Balearic Blue" - 6:32
"Closer To Me" - with Elles - 6:31
"Cruisin'" - 5:26
"Revealed" - with Steve Kilbey - 5:55
"Loneliness" - with Bobo - 5:27
"Twilight" - 3:55
"I Love You" - with Mike Francis - 4:19
"Lightning" - 6:15
"Fallen" - with Delerium and Rani - 4:04
"City Of Angels" - 4:55
"Ocean Tribe" - 3:56
"Summer Sun" - 7:19
"Someone Like You" - with Mike Francis - 5:04
"Warm Weather" - 4:24

CD2 - Moon  	  
"Twilight (Grill & Chill Mix)" - 6:04
"City Of Angels (Beach House Mix)" - 4:54
"Balearic Blue (Sa Trincha Mix)" - 6:28
"Don't U Know" - 7:15
"Loneliness (Chill House Mix)" - with Bobo - 6:30
"Stars Shine Bright (L.A. By Night Mix)" - 5:57
"I Love You (Late Night Mix)" - with Mike Francis - 4:26
"Feel The Sunshine" - 7:33
"Rio Loungin'" - 5:32
"Perfect Silence (Dub Session)" - with Bobo - 6:44
"Mind Of The Wonderful (Acoustic Version)" - with Elles - 3:51
"Revealed (Late Night Dub)" - with Steve Kilbey - 5:16

Relax Edition 2 (2007 Reissue) Water Music Dance #302 060 657 2.  Double CD, Digipak.

Track listing
CD1 - Sun
Same as original pressing.

CD2 - Moon  	  
"Revealed (Bliss Remix)" - with Steve Kilbey - 6:10
"Twilight (Grill & Chill Mix)" - 6:04
"City Of Angels (Beach House Mix)" - 4:54
"Balearic Blue (Sa Trincha Mix)" - 6:28
"Don't U Know" - 7:15
"Loneliness (Chill House Mix)" - with Bobo - 6:30
"Stars Shine Bright (L.A. By Night Mix)" - 5:57
"I Love You (Late Night Mix)" - with Mike Francis - 4:26
"Feel The Sunshine" - 7:33
"Rio Loungin'" - 5:32
"Perfect Silence (Dub Session)" - with Bobo - 6:44
"Mind Of The Wonderful (Acoustic Version)" - with Elles - 3:51

"Revealed (Late Night Dub)" - with Steve Kilbey - 5:16 is NOT included on this printing.

Relax Edition 2 (200X Reissue) SoundColours #SC0102.  Double CD, cardboard box/digi-pak.

Track listing
CD1 - Sun
"Balearic Blue" - 6:32
"Closer To Me" - with Elles - 6:31
"Cruisin'" - 5:26
"Revealed" - with Steve Kilbey - 5:55
"Loneliness" - with Bobo - 5:27
"Twilight" - 3:55
"I Love You" - with Mike Francis - 4:19
"Lightning" - 6:15
"Fallen" - with Delerium and Rani - 4:04
"City Of Angels" - 4:55
"Ocean Tribe" - 3:56
"Summer Sun" - 7:19
"Someone Like You" - with Mike Francis - 5:04

"Warm Weather" - 4:24, available on both prior printings, is NOT included on this printing.

CD2 - Moon  	  
"Revealed (Bliss Remix)" - with Steve Kilbey - 6:10
"Twilight (Grill & Chill Mix)" - 6:04
"City Of Angels (Beach House Mix)" - 4:54
"Balearic Blue (Sa Trincha Mix)" - 6:28
"Don't U Know" - 7:15
"Loneliness (Chill House Mix)" - with Bobo - 6:30
"Stars Shine Bright (L.A. By Night Mix)" - 5:57
"I Love You (Late Night Mix)" - with Mike Francis - 4:26
"Feel The Sunshine" - 7:33
"Rio Loungin'" - 5:32
"Perfect Silence (Dub Session)" - with Bobo - 6:44
"Mind Of The Wonderful (Acoustic Version)" - with Elles - 3:51
"Revealed (Late Night Dub)" - with Steve Kilbey - 5:16

Blank & Jones albums
2005 albums